Margie Sudre (born 17 October 1943) is a Vietnamese-born Reunionese politician and Member of the European Parliament for France's "Outre-mer".

Politic 
Before her election to the European Parliament (UMP-"les républicains"), she held several political mandates, both local and national: chairwoman of the Réunion Island regional Council (1993–1998, member since 1998), Secretary of State for the French-Speaking World (1995–1997). She worked to make French the second official language of the Atlanta Olympic Games.

She is a member of the Union for a Popular Movement, which is part of the European People's Party, and sits on the European Parliament's Committee on Fisheries and its Committee on Regional Development.

She is a member of the delegation to the EU–Russia Parliamentary Cooperation Committee, a substitute for the delegation for relations with the countries of Southeast Asia and the Association of Southeast Asian Nations, and, as Head of the French UMP MEP delegation, a member of the EPP-ED bureau.

Career
 Specialisation in anaesthesia and resuscitation (1976)
 Doctor of medicine (1977)
 Replacement anaesthetist (including resuscitation) (1971–1977)
 Anaesthetist (including resuscitation) at the Joan of Arc Clinic (La Réunion) (1977–1995)
 Chairman of the Réunion Island Regional Council (1993–1998)
 State Secretary for the French-Speaking World (1995–1997)
 Member of the European Parliament (elected 1999, 2004). She did not candidate in 2009 elections.
 Knight of the Legion of Honour (1999)
 Officer of the Legion of Honour (2010)

References

External links

 Official website (in French)
 Official website for UMP MEP (in French)
 European Parliament

1943 births
Living people
Politicians of the French Fifth Republic
Women from Réunion in politics
Presidents of the Regional Council of Réunion
Members of the Regional Council of Réunion
MEPs for France 1999–2004
MEPs for the Overseas Territories of France 2004–2009
The Republicans (France) politicians
Union for a Popular Movement MEPs
20th-century women MEPs for France
21st-century women MEPs for France
People of Vietnamese descent from Réunion
Officiers of the Légion d'honneur
Black French politicians
Women government ministers of France